SMS Vulkan was a U-boat salvage tug in the Kaiserliche Marine laid down in 1907 and commissioned 1908. The ship displaced 1595 tons and had a top speed of 12 knots.

The famous U-boat commander Max Valentiner served as salvage officer on Vulkan in early 1911. On 17 January 1911, he and the crew saved all 30 men from U-3 by rescuing them through the torpedo tube after it sank near Kiel harbour in Heikendorfer Bay because of an unclosed valve in the ventilation shaft.

At the end of World War One on 11 November 1918 the vessel surrendered to the British forces together with the larger salvage tug . It sank en route to Harwich on 6 April 1919 in position .

See also
 Russian salvage ship Kommuna

External links

u-boot-net.de webpage about SMS Vulkan (in German)
max-valentiner.dk webpage about Max Valentiner and salvage of U-3 in 1911  (in Danish)

Auxiliary ships of the Imperial German Navy
World War I auxiliary ships of Germany
Shipwrecks in the North Sea
1907 ships
Maritime incidents in 1919
Ships built in Kiel